"It Looks Like Rain in Cherry Blossom Lane" is a popular song written by composer Joe Burke and lyricist Edgar Leslie. It was published in 1937.

It was first recorded by Arthur Tracy, "The Street Singer".  In July 1937, the recording of the song by Guy Lombardo, with vocals by his brother, Lebert Lombardo, reached number 1 on the Billboard Best Seller chart, and another version, by Shep Fields, reached number 6.  The song was also recorded by Lennie Hayton (1937), Gracie Fields (1937), Joe Loss (1937), the London Piano Accordeon Band (1937), The Lennon Sisters (1957), and Debbie Reynolds (1960), among others.

References

1937 songs
Songs with music by Joe Burke (composer)
Songs written by Edgar Leslie